London Buses route 30 is a Transport for London contracted bus route in London, England. Running between Hackney Wick and Marble Arch station, it is operated by Metroline.

History

By 1987 the route had been amended to run from Hackney to Earl's Court, taking about 75 minutes to complete the journey, at a frequency of one bus every 14 minutes. Driver-only operation was introduced in January 1987 with double-deckers, and three months later the route was reported to be carrying around 20,000 passengers per day.

In June 2010, the route was revealed to be the sixth worst performing route in London. As a result of this, new bus priority measures were introduced on the route.

Upon being re-tendered in 2010, the route was awarded to First London from 25 June 2011.

On 22 June 2013, route 30 was included in the sale of First London's Lea Interchange garage to Tower Transit.

On 23 June 2018, the route passed to Metroline operating from their King's Cross (KC) garage.

In 2021, the service frequency during morning and evening peaks Monday to Friday was reduced from 7 buses per hour to 6.

Bomb incident

On 7 July 2005 at 09:47, a Stagecoach London Dennis Trident 2 double-decker bus, fleet number 17758, registration LX03 BUF, was involved in a terrorist attack perpetrated by Hasib Hussain, a bomb in whose rucksack exploded, killing 13 other passengers as well as himself. The explosion ripped the roof off the top deck of the bus and destroyed the back of the vehicle. The detonation took place close to the British Medical Association building in Tavistock Square. The bus was off line of route and on diversion due to earlier multiple attacks on the London Underground system. The bus was replaced by the first Alexander Dennis Enviro400 produced, named Spirit of London to symbolise the courage of Londoners.

Current route
Route 30 operates via these primary locations:
Hackney Wick Trowbridge Road
South Hackney Morning Lane
Hackney Central station 
Hackney Downs station  
Dalston Junction station 
Kingsland High Street
Canonbury
Highbury Corner
Islington Town Hall
St Mary's Church
Angel station 
King's Cross station  
St Pancras International  
British Library
Euston bus station  for Euston station   
Euston Square station 
Great Portland Street station 
Regent's Park station 
Baker Street station 
Marble Arch station

Cultural references
The #30 bus is mentioned in the song Kiss Me Deadly, by the pop music band Generation X, which was released on their 1978 long-player Generation X.

References

External links

Timetable

Bus routes in London
July 2005 London bombings
Transport in the City of Westminster
Transport in the London Borough of Camden
Transport in the London Borough of Islington
Transport in the London Borough of Hackney